George Forrester may refer to:

George Forrester (footballer, born 1927) (1927–1981), English football player
George Forrester (footballer, born 1934) (1934–2001), Scottish football player
George Forrester (cricketer) (1890–1959), Scottish cricketer
George Forrester, 1st Lord Forrester (died 1654), created Lord Forrester in 1633
George Forrester, 5th Lord Forrester (1688–1727)
George Forrester, 6th Lord Forrester (1724–1748)
George Forrester and Company, a British marine engine and locomotive manufacturer

See also
Forrester (surname)